Phaius fragilis is a species of orchid in the genus Phaius endemic to the Philippines.

References

fragilis
Plants described in 1938
Orchids of the Philippines